8 Ball Bunny is a Warner Bros. Looney Tunes cartoon directed by Chuck Jones. The short was released on July 8, 1950, and stars Bugs Bunny.

Plot
The Brooklyn Ice Palace shuts down after the Ice Frolics pack up to go to another show somewhere else. But during their departure, the Ice Frolics crew forget their star performer, Playboy Penguin. Playboy is found by Bugs Bunny, who vows to take him home. But upon discovering penguins come from the South Pole, exclaims, "Ooh, I'm dyyyin'!"

To go down south, Bugs and Playboy hitch a ride on a freight train to New Orleans.

Once in New Orleans, Bugs puts Playboy aboard a ship named the Admiral Byrd, which he believes is going to the South Pole. Afterwards, Bugs orders a carrot martini at La Bouche Cafe and stays for Mardi Gras. After hearing that the ship is actually headed for Brooklyn, Bugs swims out to it to rescue Playboy and finds him hanging upside down in the ship's kitchen among uncooked chickens, but rather than swimming back to New Orleans, they end up on a tropical island.

While Bugs strums a guitar and composes a calypso ballad (six years before the style was popularized by "The Banana Boat Song"), Playboy is forced to build a dugout boat. As Bugs is playing, Humphrey Bogart, straight out of the film The Treasure of the Sierra Madre, appears and asks him if he can "help out a fellow American who's down on his luck". Bugs reaches into his pocket, digs around, pulls out a coin, and flips it at him and tells him to "hit the road".

After 10 days at sea, Bugs is beginning to feel hungry, having not taken any food with them. Upon looking at Playboy, Bugs remembers a hobo on the train saying that penguins are practically chickens and decides to eat Playboy, but immediately snaps out of his daze and apologizes to Playboy, just as he spots land. The land, however, is the Panama Canal and when the guard at the first lock demands a quarter for passage through, Bugs refuses to pay it and decides he and Playboy will continue the journey on foot.

While trekking through the tough South American jungle, Bugs and Playboy end up in a cauldron of cannibals and are about to be eaten by the chanting natives when one comes running shouting "El Bwana," which scares the other natives away. Bugs Bunny intrepidly awaits "El Bwana," which turns out to be Bogart asking again, "Pardon me but could you help out a fellow American who's down on his luck?" Rather than berate him again, Bugs just gives him a coin for saving his and Playboy's life. Then he and Playboy resume their journey.

Bugs and Playboy's route continues down through the rest of South America nearly straight to the South Pole, with Bugs having to swing through trees, outswim a hungry crocodile, scale a mountain in the Andes and sail a boat through the South Pacific to the Antarctic.

Bugs brings Playboy to the exact South Pole and says that he has brought him home like he promised and is leaving, causing Playboy to cry. Bugs asks what the problem is now, to which Playboy shows Bugs a flyer for his performance which reads "The Ice Frolics PRESENTS The Only Hoboken Born Penguin In Captivity Skating" and Bugs (realizing that he would still have to travel more than half the Earth to get Playboy to his true destination) yells, "Oooh, I'm dyyyin' again!" Bogart appears yet again and starts to ask for Bugs' help. This time, Bugs interrupts and asks Bogart if "he can help out a fellow American who's down on his luck." With that, he thrusts Playboy into Bogart's hands and runs off into the distance while laughing hysterically.

Production notes
8 Ball Bunny is the second appearance of Playboy Penguin; his first appearance was in 1949's Frigid Hare. The Bogart voice was performed by impressionist Dave Barry (no relation to the humor columnist).

While the film is introduced by the Looney Tunes music The Merry-Go-Round Broke Down, the opening card indicates a Merrie Melodies Blue Ribbon release with the 1959–1964 red rings, as does the end card billed as a "Vitaphone Release", replacing the original green opening and ending sequences.

Reception
Cartoonist Jeff Smith writes, "8 Ball Bunny feels more like one of Chuck Jones' one-shot cartoons, such as Feed the Kitty (1952) or One Froggy Evening (1955) than the standard Bugs vs. Elmer outing. 8 Ball Bunny involves long time spans, days of travel, very few blackout gags, and a story with an actual beginning, middle, and end. Also, the little performing penguin is a bit of a cross between Michigan J. Frog and Marc Antony's adorable kitten: He's a performer with a top hat, and he's so cute, he's unbearable. In a perfect Chuck Jones kind of way, of course."

Edited version
When the short aired on ABC, the part where Bugs and Playboy are captured by South American natives is edited to remove the part where one of the natives runs to warn the group of "El Bwana" Humphrey Bogart coming and the group scattering. The scene was replaced with a frozen shot of Bogart's feet while the sound of the group muttering and fleeing was heard. However, the short has been aired uncensored (as recently as 2015) on Cartoon Network, Boomerang and the Canadian cable channel Teletoon Retro. MeTV aired it unedited on June 26, 2021.

Home media
The short is included in the VHS release Looney Tunes Video Show Volume 3, can be seen as a bonus feature on the DVD releases of the movie The Treasure of the Sierra Madre (the Humphrey Bogart caricature in this cartoon short is based on Bogart's character in the film) and the documentary film March of the Penguins. It is also featured uncensored and uncut and digitally remastered on the fourth volume of the Looney Tunes Golden Collection DVD set, as well as disc one of The Essential Bugs Bunny, Looney Tunes Platinum Collection: Volume 1, and Bugs Bunny 80th Anniversary Collection.

References

External links
 

American animated short films
1950 animated films
1950 short films
Looney Tunes shorts
Warner Bros. Cartoons animated short films
Short films directed by Chuck Jones
Films set in Antarctica
Films set in Brooklyn
Films set in New Orleans
Animation based on real people
Cultural depictions of Humphrey Bogart
Films scored by Carl Stalling
Bugs Bunny films
Animated films about penguins
1950s Warner Bros. animated short films
Films with screenplays by Michael Maltese
1950s English-language films
American comedy short films
Animated films about rabbits and hares